I'm Sorry I'm Leaving is an acoustic EP released by American rock band Saves the Day, released by Immigrant Sun on July 1, 1999.

It differed from the band's debut album, Can't Slow Down, by having a lighter acoustic sound.

Background and recording
Saves the Day formed in late 1997, their debut album, Can't Slow Down, was released with Equal Vision in August 1998. The album helped the band gain fans, but only in the New Jersey area. The band promoted the album with two tours, which helped the band expand their fan base. Saves the Day had three different line-up changes while touring Can't Slow Down, leaving vocalist Chris Conley and Newman as the only original members left.

I'm Sorry I'm Leaving was recorded and mixed at Shoulder to the Wheel Studio in March 1999. The EP was mastered by M.J.R. at Metropolis Mastering Ltd.

Release
I'm Sorry I'm Leaving was released on Immigrant Sun Records on July 1, 1999. It includes a cover of Modern English's "I Melt with You".

Track listing 
All songs written by Chris Conley, except "I Melt with You" by Modern English.

CD version
 "I'm Sorry I'm Leaving" – 2:48
 "Hold" – 2:22
 "Jessie & My Whetstone" – 2:06
 "Take Our Cars Now!" – 2:38
 "I Melt with You" (Modern English cover) – 2:57

7" vinyl version
 "I'm Sorry I'm Leaving"
 "Hold"
 "The Way His Collar Falls"

Personnel
Personnel per booklet.

Saves the Day
 Chris Conley – vocals
 Bryan Newman – drums
 Eben D'Amico – bass
 Ted Alexander – rhythm guitar
 David Soloway – lead guitar

Production
 M.J.R. – mastering
 Sean Mallinson – layout, design

References
 Citations

Sources

External links

I'm Sorry I'm Leaving at MySpace (streamed copy where licensed)

Saves the Day albums
1999 EPs